Melanoplus complanatipes, the western sagebrush grasshopper, is a species of spur-throated grasshopper in the family Acrididae. It is found in Central America and North America.

Subspecies
 Melanoplus complanatipes canonicus Scudder, 1897
 Melanoplus complanatipes complanatipes Scudder, 1897

References

Further reading

 
 

Melanoplinae